The 2021–22 season was Parma Calcio 1913's 108th season in existence. In addition to the Serie B, Parma participated in this season's edition of the Coppa Italia. On 27 May 2021, Parma announced that Enzo Maresca would be the new team's coach.

Serie B

League table

Results summary

Results by round

Coppa Italia 

Results list Parma's goal tally first.

References

External links

Parma Calcio 1913 seasons
Parma